Chase Vodka is a single estate potato vodka made in Herefordshire, England, UK by William Chase, who is also known for founding Tyrrells crisps.

Chase Vodka was voted Best in the world in April 2010 at the San Francisco World Spirits Competition.

Their distillery has the tallest rectification column in Europe, possibly the world.

Company history
The Chase Distillery, the UK's first single-estate distillery, was founded on a farm in Herefordshire in 2008. It is a family business run by its founder, William Chase  Proceeds from the sale of Tyrrells were then used to establish the Chase Distillery, which produced its first batch of vodka in June 2008. In its first year, Chase Distillery sales reached £140,000, and continued growth enabled the company to create a worldwide export market that included 36 countries between 2010 and 2016. As of February 2016, the Chase Distillery was selling 10,000 bottles of spirits per week.

Product description
Chase Vodka is a premium potato-based vodka made from specialty potato varieties such as Lady Claire and King Edward. It is a single-estate vodka, meaning that the base ingredients used for the vodka are produced on site (including the apples used for Naked Chase Apple Vodka). The production process involves peeling, heating and mashing the potatoes before adding yeast for fermentation. Next the potatoes are transferred to a traditional copper pot still where steam is used to raise the temperature and encourage distillation. Vapours rise up through the 70 ft tall rectification column, resulting in a vodka that has effectively been distilled 119 times. Finally, distilled water from the onsite borehole – which draws water from underneath the farm's apple trees – is used to dilute the vodka to 40% ABV.

Flavours
Chase Original Vodka is described on the company website as "a beautifully smooth vodka with a naturally sweet and creamy taste". Other potato vodka products from the Chase Distillery are flavoured with elderflower (Chase Elderflower Liqueur), fresh fruit (Chase Fresh Fruit Liqueurs), Seville orange (Chase Marmalade Vodka), smoked oak (Chase English Oak Smoked Vodka) and rhubarb (Chase Rhubarb Vodka). Chase also produces an apple vodka (Naked Chase Apple Vodka), using apples sourced from their estate, in addition to a range of gin products (Williams Gin).

Awards
Chase Vodka was named as the world's best vodka at the 2010 San Francisco World Spirits Competition, beating 249 other vodkas from countries including Russia and Poland.

See also 
 William Chase
 Tyrrells (crisps)
 Williams Gin

References

External links
Official website
Chase vodka (Slovenia)
San Francisco World Spirits Competition
Lady Claire potatoes
King Edward potatoes

Alcoholic drink brands
British vodkas
British brands
Products introduced in 2008